The Liberian National County Meet is the top knockout county tournament of the Liberian football inaugurated in 1956.

2021 Lofa County 3-1Montserrado County

Previous champions

1956 : Maryland County - Montserrado County
1969 : Grand Cape Mount County - Montserrado County
1974 : Grand Kru County  
1977 : Grand Kru County  
1978 : Nimba County
1979 : Nimba County
1985 : Grand Kru County 1985: Grand Kru 2 Grand Bassa 0
1987 : Grand Kru County 1987: Grand Kru 4 Margibi 1
1989: Grand Gedeh County
1990: Grand Bassa 1-0 Nimba
2004 : Gbarpolu County 2-1 Lofa County
2007 : Rivercess County 2-0 Grand Gedeh County
2008 : Bong County 4-3 Rivercess County
2009 : Bomi County 5-2 River Gee County
2010 : Nimba County 2-0 Grand Gedeh County
2011 : Nimba County - Margibi County
2012 : Margibi County 2-0 Nimba County
2013 : Grand Cape Mount County 1-1 (aet, 3-1 pen) Montserrado County
2014: Grand Bassa 2-1 Nimba County
2015: N/A (*was cancelled due to the Ebola epidemic)
2016: Grand Bassa 1-1 (aet, 3-1 pen) Montserrado County
2017: Maryland 1-1 Montserrado (1-3 penalty win for Montserrado)
2018: Montserrado 2-0 Bong

2019: Grand Kru 4-2 Nimba
2020: Lofa 3-1 Montserrado
2021: Nimba 2-1 Gbarpolu
2022: Nimba 3-2 Lofa
In 1970: Sasstown Territory is now part of Grand Kru County won the county meet and Kru Coast territory won it in 1974. Grand Kru County won the county meet four times. Some of the players of Sasstown at that time were Patrick Arthur, Anthony Wesseh, Tarpeh Roberts, Sylvester Red' Weah, Michael Tarplah, Anthony Sayon Nagbe alas Experience Tony, Telemu,

References

External links
Liberia National County Meet
Liberiansoccer.com - "the official home of Liberian football" - "FIFA approved" - current official standings provided

Football competitions in Liberia